This is a list of 339 genera in the subfamily Cassidinae, tortoise beetles and hispines.

Cassidinae genera

 Acanthodes Baly, 1864 i c g
 Acentroptera Guérin-Méneville, 1844 i c g
 Acmenychus Weise, 1905 i c g
 Acritispa Uhmann, 1940 i c g
 Acrocassis Spaeth, 1922 i c g
 Acromis Chevrolat in Dejean, 1836 i c g
 Adalurnus Maulik, 1936 i c g
 Aethiopocassis Spaeth, 1922 i c g
 Agathispa Weise, 1905 i c g
 Agenysa Spaeth, 1905 i c g
 Agoniella Weise, 1911 i c g
 Agonita Strand, 1942 i c g
 Agroiconota Spaeth, 1913 i c g b
 Aidoia Spaeth, 1952 i c g
 Alurnus Fabricius, 1775 i c g
 Amblispa Baly, 1858 i c g
 Amythra Spaeth, 1913 i c g
 Anacassis Spaeth, 1913 i c g
 Andevocassis Spaeth, 1924 i c g
 Androya Spaeth, 1911 i c g
 Anepsiomorpha Spaeth, 1913 i c g
 Anisochalepus Uhmann, 1940 i c g
 Anisodera Chevrolat in Dejean, 1836 i c g
 Anisostena Weise, 1910 i c g b
 Aporocassida Spaeth, 1952 i c g
 Aproida Pascoe, 1863 i c g
 Arescus Perty, 1832 i c g
 Asamangulia Maulik, 1915 i c g
 Aslamidium Borowiec, 1984 i c g
 Aspidimorpha Hope, 1840 i c g
 Aspidispa Baly, 1869 i c g
 Asteriza Chevrolat in Dejean, 1836 i c g
 Aulostyrax Maulik, 1929 i c g
 Austropsecadia Hincks, 1950 i c g
 Baliosus Weise, 1905 i c g b
 Balyana Péringuey, 1898 i c g
 Basiprionota Chevrolat in Dejean, 1836 i c g
 Basipta Chevrolat, 1849 i c g
 Botanochara Dejean, 1836 i c g
 Bothrispa Uhmann, 1940 i c
 Bothryonopa Guérin-Méneville, 1840 i c g
 Brachycoryna Guérin-Méneville, 1844 i c g b
 Bradycassis Spaeth, 1952 i c g
 Brontispa Sharp, 1904 i c g
 Bruchia Weise, 1906 i c g
 Bulolispa Gressitt and Samuelson, 1990 i c g
 Calamispa Gressitt, 1957 i c g
 Caledonispa Uhmann, 1952 i c g
 Callanispa Uhmann, 1959 i c g
 Calliaspis Dejean, 1836 i c g
 Callispa Baly, 1858 i c g
 Callistola Dejean, 1836 i c g
 Callohispa Uhmann, 1960 i c g
 Calyptocephala Chevrolat in Dejean, 1836 i c g
 Canistra Erichson, 1847 i c g
 Capelocassis Spaeth, 1952 i c g
 Carinispa Uhmann, 1930 i c g
 Carlobruchia Spaeth, 1911 i c g
 Cassida Linnaeus, 1758 i c g b
 Cassidinoma Hincks, 1950 i c g
 Cassidispa Gestro, 1899 i c g
 Cassidopsis Fairmaire, 1899 i c g
 Cephaloleia Chevrolat in Dejean, 1836 i c g
 Ceratispa Gestro, 1895 i c g
 Chacocassis Spaeth, 1952 i c g
 Chaeridiona Baly, 1869 i c g
 Chalepispa Uhmann, 1955 i c g
 Chalepotatus Weise, 1910 i c g
 Chalepus Thunberg, 1805 i c g b
 Charidotella Weise, 1896 i c g b
 Charidotis Boheman, 1854 i c g
 Charistena Baly, 1864 i c g
 Chelobasis Gray, 1832 i c g
 Chelymorpha Chevrolat in Dejean, 1836 i c g b
 Chelysida Fairmaire, 1882 i c g
 Chersinellina Hincks, 1950 i c g
 Chiridopsis Spaeth, 1922 i c g
 Chiridula Weise, 1889 i c g
 Chlamydocassis Spaeth, 1952 i c g
 Chrysispa Weise, 1897 i c g
 Cirrispa Uhmann, 1936 i c g
 Cistudinella Champion, 1894 i c g
 Cladispa Baly, 1858 i c g
 Clinocarispa Uhmann, 1935 i c g
 Cnetispa Maulik, 1930 i c g
 Coelaenomenodera Blanchard, 1845 i c g
 Conchyloctenia Spaeth, 1902 i c g
 Coptocycla Chevrolat in Dejean, 1836 i c g b
 Coraliomela Jacobson, 1899 i c g
 Corynispa Uhmann, 1940 i c g
 Crambelea Spaeth, 1913 i c g
 Craspedonispa Weise, 1910 i c g
 Craspedonta Chevrolat in Dejean, 1836 i c g
 Cryptonychus Gyllenhal, 1817 i c g
 Cteisella Weise, 1896 i c g
 Ctenocassida Spaeth, 1926 i c g
 Ctenocharidotis Spaeth, 1926 i c g
 Ctenophilaspis Spaeth, 1926 i c g
 Cubispa Barber, 1946 i c g
 Cyclocassis Spaeth, 1913 i c g
 Cyclosoma Guérin-Méneville, 1835 i c g
 Cyperispa Gressitt, 1957 i c g
 Cyrtonota Chevrolat in Dejean, 1836 i c g
 Dactylispa Weise, 1897 i c g
 Decatelia Weise, 1904 i c g
 Delocrania Guérin-Méneville, 1844 i c g
 Deloyala Chevrolat in Dejean, 1836 i c g b
 Demotispa Baly, 1858 i c g
 Dicladispa Gestro, 1897 i c g
 Discomorpha Chevrolat in Dejean, 1836 i c g
 Dorcathispa Weise, 1901 i c g
 Dorynota Chevrolat in Dejean, 1836 i c g
 Downesia Baly, 1858 i c g
 Drepanocassis Spaeth, 1936 i c g
 Drescheria Weise, 1911 i c g
 Echoma Chevrolat in Dejean, 1836 i c g
 Elytrogona Chevrolat in Dejean, 1836 i c g
 Emdenia Spaeth, 1915 i c g
 Enagria Spaeth, 1913 i c g
 Enischnispa Gressitt, 1957 i c g
 Epistictina Hincks, 1950 i c g
 Erbolaspis Spaeth, 1924 i c g
 Eremionycha Spaeth, 1911 i c
 Erepsocassis Spaeth, 1936 i c g b
 Estigmena Hope, 1840 i c g
 Eugenysa Chevrolat in Dejean, 1836 i c g
 Euprionota Guérin-Méneville, 1844 i c g
 Eurispa Baly, 1858 i c g
 Eurypedus Gistel, 1834 i c g
 Eurypepla Boheman, 1854 i c g
 Eutheria Spaeth, 1909 i c g
 Euxema Baly, 1885 i c g
 Exestastica Spaeth, 1909 i c g
 Exothispa Kolbe, 1897 i c g
 Floridocassis Spaeth in Hincks, 1952 i c g b
 Fornicocassis Spaeth, 1917 i c g
 Fossispa Staines, 1989 i c g
 Gestronella Weise, 1911 i c g
 Glyphocassis Spaeth, 1914 i c g
 Glyphuroplata Uhmann, 1937 i c g b
 Goniochenia Weise, 1896 i c g
 Gonophora Chevrolat in Dejean, 1836 i c g
 Goyachalepus Pic, 1929 i c g
 Gratiana Spaeth, 1913 i c g b
 Gyllenhaleus Weise, 1903 i c g
 Hemisphaerota Chevrolat in Dejean, 1836 i c g b
 Heptachispa Uhmann, 1953 i c g
 Heptatomispa Uhmann, 1940 i c g
 Heptispa Weise, 1906 i c g b
 Herissa Spaeth, 1909 i c g
 Herminella Spaeth, 1913 i c g
 Heterispa Chapuis, 1875 i c g
 Heteronychocassis Spaeth, 1915 i c g
 Heterrhachispa Gressitt, 1957 i c g
 Hilarocassis Spaeth, 1913 i c g b
 Hispa Linnaeus, 1767 i c g
 Hispellinus Weise, 1897 i c g
 Hispodonta Baly, 1858 i c g
 Hispoleptis Baly, 1864 i c g
 Homalispa Baly, 1858 i c g
 Hovacassis Spaeth, 1952 i c g
 Hybosa Duponchel, 1842 i c g
 Hybosinota Spaeth, 1909 i c g
 Hybosispa Weise, 1910 i c g
 Hypocassida Weise, 1893 i c g
 Imatidium Fabricius, 1801 i c g
 Ischiocassis Spaeth, 1917 i c g
 Ischnispa Gressitt, 1963 i c g
 Ischnocodia Spaeth, 1942 i c g
 Ischyronota Weise, 1891 i c g
 Isopedhispa Spaeth, 1936 i c g
 Jambhala Würmli, 1975 i c g
 Javeta Baly, 1858 i c g
 Jonthonota Spaeth, 1913 i c g b
 Klitispa Uhmann, 1940 i c g
 Laccoptera Boheman, 1855 i c g
 Lasiochila Weise, 1916 i c g
 Leptispa Baly, 1858 i c g
 Leptocodia Spaeth, 1952 i c g
 Leucispa Chapuis, 1875 i c g
 Limnocassis Spaeth, 1952 i c g
 Lorentzocassis Spaeth, 1913 i c g
 Macrispa Baly, 1858 i c g
 Macromonycha Spaeth, 1911 i c g
 Mahatsinia Spaeth, 1919 i c g
 Malayocassis Spaeth, 1952 i c g
 Mecistomela Jacobson, 1899 i c g
 Megapyga Boheman, 1850 i c g
 Melanispa Baly, 1858 i c g
 Meroscalsis Spaeth, 1903 i c g
 Mesomphalia Hope, 1839 i c g
 Metazycera Chevrolat in Dejean, 1836 i c g
 Metriona Weise, 1896 i c g
 Metrionella Spaeth, 1932 i c g b
 Metriopepla Fairmaire, 1882 i c g
 Mexicaspis Spaeth, 1936 i c g
 Micrispa Gestro, 1897 i c g
 Microctenochira Spaeth, 1926 i c g b
 Microrhopala Chevrolat in Dejean, 1836 i c g b
 Mimoethispa Pic, 1927 i c g
 Miocalaspis Weise, 1899 i c g
 Monagonia Uhmann, 1931 i c g
 Nabathaea Spaeth, 1911 i c g
 Nanocthispa Monrós and Viana, 1947 i c g
 Nebraspis Spaeth, 1913 i c g
 Nesohispa Maulik, 1913 i c g
 Nilgiraspis Spaeth, 1932 i c g
 Nonispa Maulik, 1933 i c g
 Notosacantha Chevrolat in Dejean, 1836 i c g
 Nuzonia Spaeth, 1912 i c g
 Nympharescus Weise, 1905 i c g
 Ocnosispa Weise, 1910 i c g
 Octhispa Chapuis, 1877 i c g
 Octocladiscus Thomson, 1856 i c g
 Octodonta Chapuis, 1875 i c g
 Octotoma Dejean, 1836 i g b
 Octuroplata Uhmann, 1940 i c g
 Odontispa Uhmann, 1940 i c g
 Odontota Chevrolat in Dejean, 1836 i c g b
 Oediopalpa Baly, 1858 i c g
 Ogdoecosta Spaeth, 1909 i c g
 Omaspides Chevrolat in Dejean, 1836 i c g
 Omocerus Chevrolat, 1835 i c g
 Omoteina Chevrolat in Dejean, 1836 i c g
 Oncocephala Agassiz, 1846 i c g
 Oocassida Weise, 1897 i c g
 Opacinota E. Riley, 1986 i c g b
 Orexita Spaeth, 1911 i c g
 Orobiocassis Spaeth, 1934 i c g
 Ovotispa Medvedev, 1992 i c g
 Oxycephala Guérin-Méneville, 1838 i c g
 Oxychalepus Uhmann, 1937 i c g
 Oxylepus Desbrochers, 1884 i c g
 Oxyroplata Uhmann, 1940 i c g
 Palmispa Gressitt, 1960 i c g
 Parachirida Hincks, 1952 i c g
 Paranota Monrós and Viana, 1949 i c g
 Paraselenis Spaeth, 1913 i c g
 Paratrikona Spaeth, 1923 i c g
 Parimatidium Spaeth, 1938 i c g
 Parorectis Spaeth, 1901 i c g b
 Parvispa Uhmann, 1940 i c g
 Pentispa Chapuis, 1875 i c g b
 Peronycha Weise, 1909 i c
 Pharangispa Maulik, 1929 i c g
 Phidodontina Uhmann, 1938 i c g
 Philodonta Weise, 1904 i c g
 Physocoryna Guérin-Méneville, 1844 i c g
 Physonota Boheman, 1854 i c g b
 Phytodectoidea Spaeth, 1909 i c g
 Pilemostoma Desbrochers, 1891 i c g
 Pistosia Weise, 1905 i c g
 Plagiometriona Spaeth, 1899 (incl. Helocassis) i c g b
 Platocthispa Uhmann, 1939 i c g
 Platyauchenia Sturm, 1843 i c g
 Platycycla Boheman, 1854 i c g
 Platypria Guérin-Méneville, 1840 i c g
 Plesispa Chapuis, 1875 i c g
 Pleurispa Weise, 1902 i c g
 Poecilaspidella Spaeth, 1913 i c g
 Polychalca Chevrolat in Dejean, 1836 i c g
 Polychalma Barber and Bridwell, 1940 i c g
 Polyconia Weise, 1905 i c g
 Prionispa Chapuis, 1875 i c g
 Probaenia Weise, 1904 i c g
 Promecispa Weise, 1909 i c g
 Promecotheca Blanchard, 1853 i c g
 Prosopodonta Baly, 1858 i c g
 Psalidoma Spaeth, 1899 i c g
 Pseudandroya Spaeth, 1952 i c g
 Pseudispa Chapuis, 1875 i c g
 Pseudispella Kraatz, 1895 i c g
 Pseudocalaspidea Jacobson, 1899 i c g
 Pseudocallispa Uhmann, 1931 i c g
 Pseudoctenochira Spaeth, 1926 i c g
 Pseudostilpnaspis Borowiec, 2000 i c g
 Rhabdotohispa Maulik, 1913 i c g
 Rhacocassis Spaeth, 1904 i c g
 Rhadinosa Weise, 1905 i c g
 Rhoia Spaeth, 1913 i c g
 Rhoptrispa Chen and Tan, 1965 i c g
 Rhytidocassis Spaeth, 1941 i c g
 Saulaspis Spaeth, 1913 i c g
 Scaeocassis Spaeth, 1913 i c g
 Sceloenopla Chevrolat in Dejean, 1836 i c g
 Seminabathea Borowiec, 1994 i c g
 Serratispa Staines, 2002 i c g
 Silana Spaeth, 1914 i c g
 Sinispa Uhmann, 1938 i c g
 Smeringaspis Spaeth, 1924 i c g
 Solenispa Weise, 1905 i c g
 Spaethaspis Hincks, 1952 i c g
 Spaethiella Barber and Bridwell, 1940 i c g
 Spaethispa Uhmann, 1939 i c g
 Sphenocassis Spaeth, 1911 i c g
 Spilophora Boheman, 1850 i c g
 Squamispa Maulik, 1928 i c g
 Stenispa Baly, 1858 i c g b
 Stenopodius Horn, 1883 i c g b
 Stephanispa Gressitt, 1960 i c g
 Sternocthispa Uhmann, 1938 i c g
 Sternoplispa Uhmann, 1940 i c g
 Sternostena Weise, 1910 i c g
 Sternostenoides Monrós and Viana, 1947 i c g
 Stethispa Baly, 1864 i c g
 Stilpnaspis Weise, 1905 i c g
 Stoiba Spaeth, 1909 i c g
 Stolas Billberg, 1820 i c g
 Strongylocassis Hincks, 1950 i c g b
 Sumitrosis Butte, 1969 i c g b
 Syngambria Spaeth, 1911 i c g
 Tapinaspis Spaeth, 1936 i c g
 Tegocassis Spaeth, 1924 i c g
 Temnochalepus Uhmann, 1935 i c g
 Temnocthispa Uhmann, 1939 i c g
 Teretrispa Gressitt, 1960 i c g
 Terpsis Spaeth, 1913 i c g
 Tetracassis Spaeth, 1952 i c
 Thlaspida Weise, 1899 i c g
 Thlaspidosoma Spaeth, 1901 i c g
 Thlaspidula Spaeth, 1901 i c g
 Thomispa Würmli, 1975 i c g
 Thoracispa Chapuis, 1875 i c g
 Torquispa Uhmann, 1954 i c g
 Trichaspis Spaeth, 1911 i c g
 Trichispa Chapuis, 1875 i c g
 Trigonocassis Hincks, 1950 i c g
 Trilaccodea Spaeth, 1902 i c g
 Unguispa Uhmann, 1954 i c g
 Uroplata Chevrolat in Dejean, 1836 i c g
 Vietocassis Medvedev and Eroshkina, 1988 i c g
 Wallacispa Uhmann, 1931 i c g
 Xenarescus Weise, 1905 i c g
 Xenicomorpha Spaeth, 1913 i c g
 Xenochalepus Weise, 1910 i c g b
 Xiphispa Chapuis, 1878 i c
 Zatrephina Spaeth, 1909 i c g
 Zeugonota Spaeth, 1913 i c g

Data sources: i = ITIS, c = Catalogue of Life, g = GBIF, b = Bugguide.net

References

Cassidinae